Terry William Trotter (born October 5, 1940) is an American jazz pianist and piano teacher living in Los Angeles. He has recorded with such artists as Frank Sinatra, Ella Fitzgerald, Natalie Cole, Celine Dion, Larry Carlton, and many others. Trotter composed the theme music to the television show Everybody Loves Raymond.

Early life and career
Born in Los Angeles in 1940, Trotter was the youngest of two children born to Ralph K. Trotter and Phyllis Bader. At age four, he started studying piano, but by the time he was entering adolescence, Trotter's interest in music as a whole had all but vanished. At this time, Mrs. Trotter, herself a classical pianist, had an idea. "My mom found a piano teacher whose style was very Teddy Wilson / jazz-inspired. I fell in love with jazz. Then after studying it for a couple of years, I really fell in love with classical music, too." A few years later, when it came time to decide which area to focus on professionally, newly acquired acquaintance Leonid Hambro had some helpful advice:Between his classical training and his growing reputation as a quick study, Trotter had little trouble finding work, whether in the studio or on the road.

Notes

References

Further reading
 McLean, Norma (July 26, 1984). "Opera Singer Linda Trotter Lives in City". The Columbia Record. pp. N1, N8
 Stewart, Zan (October 25, 1991). "Safe and Sane Jazz Pianist Tries It Solo". Los Angeles Times. Valley Calendar. pp. F25A, F25D
 Stewart, Zan (June 24, 1995). "Jazz Review: Trotter Exerts His Influences and Gets Special Flavors". The Los Angeles Times. Orange County Calendar. p. F2
 Kissel, Howard (October 17, 1996). "The Sound of Musicals; How do current revivals' cast albums score against the originals; A Record Time for Broadway Revivals". New York Daily News. pp. 57, 64

External links
 

American jazz pianists
American male pianists
Living people
1940 births
21st-century American pianists
21st-century American male musicians
American male jazz musicians
Musicians from Los Angeles